Eny Sulistyowati (born 14 January 1980) is an Indonesian former professional tennis player.

Born in Sukoharjo, Sulistyowati had a career high singles ranking of 662 and made two main draw appearances at the Danamon Open, a WTA Tour tournament in Jakarta. She featured as a doubles player for the Indonesia Fed Cup team across 1997 and 1998, winning four rubbers.

ITF finals

Doubles: 2 (0–2)

References

External links
 
 
 

1980 births
Living people
Indonesian female tennis players
People from Sukoharjo Regency
21st-century Indonesian women